Fiche may refer to:

 Fiche (film), short for microfiche, a flat film containing micro-images.
 Fiche (cards), a rectangular counter used in French and Danish card games.
 Fiche, Ethiopia, a town in Ethiopia.